Fulk Al Salamah ("Ship of Peace") is a superyacht in service with the Oman Royal Yacht Squadron since its completion in 2016. It was first announced in 2014 as project Saffron. It joined the Lürssen superyacht Al Said in the capital Muscat as part of the royal fleet. At , Fulk Al Salamah is the second longest yacht in the world as of 2022. It replaced a previous ship called Fulk Al Salamah which was renamed Al Dhaferah.

See also
 Oman Royal Yacht Squadron
 List of motor yachts by length

References 

2016 ships

Motor yachts
Ships built in Genoa